The Greek pantheon of gods included mortal-born heroes and heroines who were elevated to godhood through a process which the Greeks termed apotheosis. Some of these received the privilege as a reward for their helpfulness to mankind example: Heracles, Asclepius and Aristaeus, others through marriage to gods, example: Ariadne, Tithonus and Psyche, and some by luck or pure chance example: Glaucus.

List

References

Greek mythology